The Young Democratic-Progressive Party (Mlada Demokratsko-Progresivna Stranska, MDPS) was a political party in Macedonia led by Risto Ivanov.

History
The party contested the 1990 parliamentary elections, at a time when Macedonia was still part of Yugoslavia. In some areas it ran in coalition with the Union of Reform Forces (SRS), with the alliance winning six seats. In others it ran with the Socialist Party, winning one seat.

In 1991 it merged with the SRS,  which was renamed Reform Forces in Macedonia–Liberal Party, eventually becoming the Liberal Party of Macedonia.

References

Defunct political parties in North Macedonia
Political parties in Yugoslavia
Political parties disestablished in 1991